94 Piscium is a single star in the zodiac constellation Pisces, located 305 light years away from the Sun. It is visible to the naked eye as a faint, orange-hued star with an apparent visual magnitude of 5.495. The object is moving closer to the Earth with a heliocentric radial velocity of −43 km/s. It is a possible member of the Wolf 630 moving group.

This is an evolved K-type giant star with a stellar classification of K1 III. It is a red clump giant, which indicates it is on the horizontal branch and is generating energy through helium fusion at its core. The star is 4.1 billion years old with 1.34 times the mass of the Sun and 13 times the Sun's radius. It is radiating 69 times the Sun's luminosity from its enlarged photosphere at an effective temperature of 4,665 K.

References

K-type giants
Horizontal-branch stars
Pisces (constellation)
Durchmusterung objects
Piscium, 094
008763
006732
0414